Mercedes, officially the Municipality of Mercedes, is a 2nd class municipality in the province of Camarines Norte, Philippines. According to the 2020 census, it has a population of 55,334 people.

Etymology
The town was originally named "Barra", and it was a barangay of Daet, the provincial capital. Its name was changed to Mercedes after Doña Mercedes, a rich woman who devoted her life of helping the community, especially the poor.

History
Mercedes was created from the barrios of Babatnon, Lanot, Lalawigan, Pinagdamhan, Hamoraon, Colasi, Tarum, Pambuhan, Masalong-salong, Hinipaan, Matoogtoog, Cayucyucan, Mambongalon, Manguisoc, Gaboc, Mercedes, Tanayagan, Tagontong, Catandonganon, Cariñgo Island, Quinapaquian Island, Apuao Island, all formerly part of Daet, Camarines Norte, by virtue of Republic Act No. 341, approved on July 26, 1948.

Geography

Barangays

Mercedes is politically subdivided into 26 barangays.

Climate

Demographics

Economy

Tourism

Waterfalls:
 Colasi Falls - barangay Colasi
 Malunay Falls - sitio Malunay
 Bahaw Falls - barangay Hamoraon
 Hinipaan Falls - barangay Hinipaan

Education
 Mercedes Central School
 Mercedes High School (San Roque)
 Manguisoc National High School
 Camarines Norte State College - Mercedes Campus (formerly Mercedes School of Fisheries)
 Tagongtong Elementary School
 San Roque National High School
 Don Pablo S Villafuerte National High School
 Claro Ibasco Elementary School
 joseph Ibasco Elem. School
 Quinapaguian Elem. School
 Lope Manlangit Elem. School
 Mambungalon Elem. School
 Cayucyucan Elem. School
 Pambuhan Elem School
 Gaboc Elementary School
 Lalawigan Elem. School
 San Roque Elem. School
 Manguisoc Elem. School
 Tarum Elem. School
 Colasi Elem. School
 Hamoraon Elem. School
 Lanot Elem. School
 Mansalongsalong
 Mantoogtoog Elem. School
 Hinipaan·Elem. School

References

External links

 [ Philippine Standard Geographic Code]
Philippine Census Information

Municipalities of Camarines Norte